An autonomous region of the Philippines is a first-level administrative division that has the authority to control a region's culture and economy. The Constitution of the Philippines allows for two autonomous regions: in the Cordilleras and in Muslim Mindanao. Currently, Bangsamoro, which largely consists of the Muslim-majority areas of Mindanao, is the only autonomous region in the country.

Current autonomous region

Bangsamoro 

On October 15, 2012, a preliminary agreement was signed by the Government of the Philippines' chief negotiator Marvic Leonen, MILF Peace Panel Chair Mohagher Iqbal and Malaysian facilitator Tengku Dato' Ab Ghafar Tengku Mohamed along with President Aquino, Prime Minister Najib Razak of Malaysia, MILF chairman Al-Hajj Murad Ebrahim and Secretary-General Ekmeleddin İhsanoğlu of the Organisation of Islamic Cooperation at Malacañang Palace in Manila.

It replaced the Autonomous Region in Muslim Mindanao (ARMM) and was formed after voters decided to ratify the Republic Act no. 11054 or the Bangsamoro Organic Law in a January 21 plebiscite. The ratification was announced on January 25, 2019, by the Commission on Elections. This marked the beginning of the transition of the ARMM to the BARMM.

Former autonomous region

Autonomous Region in Muslim Mindanao 

The Autonomous Region in Muslim Mindanao (ARMM) was proposed in 1976 during the Ferdinand Marcos administration and created on August 1, 1989, through Republic Act No. 6734 (otherwise known as the Organic Act) in pursuance with a constitutional mandate. In 2012 President Benigno Aquino III described ARMM as a "failed experiment". He proposed an autonomous region named Bangsamoro to replace ARMM with the agreement between the government and Moro Islamic Liberation Front.

A plebiscite was held in the provinces of Basilan, Cotabato, Davao del Norte, Davao Oriental, Davao del Sur, Lanao del Norte, Lanao del Sur, Maguindanao, Palawan, South Cotabato, Sultan Kudarat, Sulu, Tawi-Tawi, Zamboanga del Norte and Zamboanga del Sur; and in the cities of Cotabato, Davao, Dapitan, Dipolog, General Santos, Koronadal, Iligan, Marawi, Pagadian, Puerto Princesa and Zamboanga to determine if their residents wished to be part of the ARMM. Of these areas, only four provinces (Lanao del Sur, Maguindanao, Sulu and Tawi-Tawi) voted in favor of inclusion in the new autonomous region. The ARMM was officially inaugurated on November 6, 1990, in Cotabato City, which was designated as its provisional capital.

The Autonomous Region in Muslim Mindanao (ARMM) ceased to exist after a two-part 2019 plebiscite that ratified the Bangsamoro Organic Law (BOL). It was replaced with the new Bangsamoro Autonomous Region in Muslim Mindanao (BARMM) and now under the interim government, Bangsamoro Transition Authority.

Western Mindanao and Central Mindanao 
Prior to the ARMM, there were two autonomous regions in Mindanao; namely Western Mindanao (Region IX) and Central Mindanao (Region XII) which each governed by a Lupong Tagapagpaganap ng Pook (LTP) or Regional Executive Council led by a chairman.

Proposed autonomous regions

Mindanao 
In the 1977 Southern Philippines autonomy plebiscite, there was a proposal to merge the Western Mindanao and Central Mindanao regions into one autonomous region called the "Bangsamoro Islamic Region".

Cordilleras 

The Cordillera Administrative Region administers the area that was designated for an autonomous region. Two plebiscites were held in the Cordilleras, the latest in 1998, to create an autonomous region, but both failed. There have been bills filed in Congress to re-propose and establish an autonomous region in the Cordilleras, but none of these have succeeded.

In 1990, a plebiscite was held to create an autonomous region under Republic Act No. 6766 but only Ifugao voted in favor of the law's ratification. The component provinces of the Cordillera Administrative Region at the time and the city of Baguio participated in the plebiscite with only localities voting in favor of the law's ratification to be part of a new autonomous region in the Cordilleras. There was also a failed attempt to establish an autonomous region with a single province.

Metro Manila 
It was proposed that the National Capital Region or Metro Manila be converted to an autonomous region. Metro Manila is governed by mayors of its 16 highly urbanized cities and 1 independent municipality with the Metropolitan Manila Development Authority serving as an advisory body to the local government units of the metropolis. Former Quezon City Mayor Herbert Bautista had advocated for a Metro Manila autonomous region as an alternative to President Rodrigo Duterte’s campaign for federalism, which would render Metro Manila as an independent state within the Philippines.

See also 

 Bangsamoro Juridical Entity
 Administrative regions of the Philippines
 Provinces of the Philippines

References

Subdivisions of the Philippines
Administrative divisions in Asia
Philippines geography-related lists
Lists of subdivisions of the Philippines